Upper atmosphere is a collective term that refers to various layers of the atmosphere of the Earth above the troposphere and corresponding regions of the atmospheres of other planets, and includes:

 The thermosphere, which on Earth lies between the altitudes of about 
 The ionosphere, an ionized portion of the upper atmosphere which includes the upper mesosphere, thermosphere, and lower exosphere and on Earth lies between the altitudes of

See also
Geospace
Magnetosphere

References

Atmosphere of Earth
Atmosphere